The Obersee near Simmerath in the borough of Aachen is the main forebay of the Rur Reservoir on the River Rur in the Eifel mountains of Germany. Its barrier is the Paulushofdamm. The reservoir, like that of the Rur Dam, belongs to the Eifel-Rur Water Company (Wasserverband Eifel-Rur). The reservoir provides drinking water.

Location 
The dam system, which comprises the Paulushofdamm and Obersee, lies in the Rur Eifel, a part of the North Eifel, southwest of the Kermeter, north of the Dreiborn Plateau and east of the Monschau Hedge Land near Simmerath (borough of Aachen). It is located immediately below the Urft Dam, which impounds the waters of the Urft that flow from the east to create the Urft Reservoir, and immediately above the Rur Dam which impounds the waters of the Rur to form the Rur Reservoir. While the dam belongs to the High Fens-Eifel Nature Park, the large eastern arm of the Obersee in the north lies within the Eifel National Park.

Photos

See also 
 List of dams in Germany

References

External links 

 Pegeldaten: 

Dams in North Rhine-Westphalia
Reservoirs in the Eifel
Aachen (district)
Reservoirs in North Rhine-Westphalia
Rock-filled dams
1950s architecture
RObersee